Dennis Andrew Kelly (born January 16, 1990) is an American football offensive tackle who is a free agent. He played college football at Purdue and was drafted by the Philadelphia Eagles in the fifth round of the 2012 NFL Draft. Kelly played with the Eagles for four seasons primarily as a reserve lineman before playing for the Tennessee Titans from 2016 to 2020, where he saw an expanded role. He has also been a member of the Green Bay Packers and Indianapolis Colts.

Early life
Kelly was born in Chicago Heights, Illinois, to an Irish family. He is the brother of NFL coach Tim Kelly. Kelly attended Marian Catholic High School in Chicago Heights, where he played tight end and some basketball.

College career
Kelly studied organizational leadership and supervision at Purdue University from 2008 to 2011 and appeared in 42 games, including 37 starts. During the 2014 offseason, he returned to Purdue to finish his degree.

Professional career

Philadelphia Eagles (2012–2015)
Kelly was drafted by the Philadelphia Eagles in the fifth round, 153rd overall, in the 2012 NFL Draft.

Kelly played in thirteen games as a rookie. He started the last ten games, three at right guard and seven at right tackle. The Eagles finished with a 4–12 record. He did not play in any games in 2013 as the Eagles finished with a 10–6 record and qualified for the playoffs, losing to the New Orleans Saints in the Wild Card round. He played in three games in 2014 from weeks 2–4, starting all three. The Eagles finished with another 10–6 record but did not qualify for the playoffs. On September 9, 2015, Kelly signed a one-year contract extension with the Eagles through 2016. He played in fourteen games, starting two, in 2015. The Eagles finished with a 7–9 record. On April 27, 2016, Kelly signed another one-year contract extension with the Eagles through 2017.

Tennessee Titans

2016 season
On August 16, 2016, Kelly was traded to the Tennessee Titans for wide receiver Dorial Green-Beckham. In his first season with the Titans, he played in all sixteen games, starting six, often being used as a sixth lineman for an offensive line that blocked for DeMarco Murray as he led the AFC in rushing yards. He notably replaced Taylor Lewan when he was ejected during the week 10 47–25 win against the Green Bay Packers. The offense amassed 446 yards and 6 touchdowns during that game. The Titans finished 9–7 from a 3–13 record last season. On July 26, 2017, Kelly signed a multi-year contract extension with the Titans.

2017 season
In 2017, Kelly remained in a backup role behind starting left tackle Taylor Lewan and starting right tackle Jack Conklin, playing in all 16 games starting one. The Titans again finished 9–7 and qualified for the playoffs, where they won the Wild Card game against the Kansas City Chiefs and lost the Divisional Round to the New England Patriots. He played in both games and replaced Conklin when he tore his ACL in the latter.

2018 season

In 2018, he played in 11 games, starting five as the Titans finished 9–7 for the third straight season. During a week 14 win against the Jacksonville Jaguars, he replaced Taylor Lewan when he left the game with an injury and subsequently replaced an injured Jack Conklin in the same game after Lewan returned. He then started the final three games of the season as Conklin was placed on injured reserve. In those final three games, he blocked for Derrick Henry as he won AFC Offensive Player of the Month for December.

2019 season
Kelly played in 15 games in 2019 and started the first four games of the season in place of Taylor Lewan as he was suspended for PED violations. On November 24, 2019, Kelly scored his first NFL touchdown on a one-yard pass from Ryan Tannehill in a 42–20 victory against the Jacksonville Jaguars. The Titans once again finished the regular season with a 9–7 record, and qualified for the playoffs where he played in both upset victories against the New England Patriots and the Baltimore Ravens.

2020 season
Set to become a free agent after the 2019 season, Kelly signed a three-year, $21 million contract extension with the Titans on March 16, 2020.

Incumbent starting right tackle Jack Conklin departed for free agency in the 2020 offseason. The Titans drafted offensive tackle Isaiah Wilson in the first round of the 2020 NFL Draft. Kelly was expected to compete with him to be the starting right tackle. Wilson, however, only appeared in a single game. Kelly started all 16 games and helped Derrick Henry rush for over 2,000 yards on the way to an 11–5 record. Kelly's season ended after the Titans' 20–13 loss to the Ravens in the AFC wild card round.

Kelly was released by the Titans on March 16, 2021.

Green Bay Packers
Kelly signed with the Green Bay Packers on July 29, 2021. He played in 10 games during the 2021 regular season, starting the last four in place of injured starting right tackle Billy Turner. The Packers finished with a 13–4 record and the No. 1 seed in the NFC. Kelly started at right tackle during the Packers' divisional round playoff loss against the San Francisco 49ers while Turner, who had returned from injury played left tackle in place of injured starter David Bakhtiari.

Indianapolis Colts
On May 10, 2022, Kelly signed with the Indianapolis Colts.

Personal life
He is married to his wife Jerianna, and they have three daughters, Eden, Isla and Emilia. They have two dogs, Harley and Sanford. In 2019, he earned an MBA from the Kelley School of Business at Indiana University.

Dennis' brother is NFL coach Tim Kelly.

References

External links
Indianapolis Colts bio
Purdue Boilermakers bio 

1990 births
American people of Irish descent
Living people
American football offensive tackles
Green Bay Packers players
Indianapolis Colts players
People from Chicago Heights, Illinois
Philadelphia Eagles players
Players of American football from Illinois
Purdue Boilermakers football players
Sportspeople from Cook County, Illinois
Tennessee Titans players